Life Less Ordinary (Chinese: 小人物向前冲) is a 130 episode drama series produced by Mediacorp Channel 8. It stars Xiang Yun, Chen Liping, Romeo Tan, Felicia Chin, Jeffrey Xu, Ian Fang, Bonnie Loo, Jayley Woo & Aileen Tan as the casts of this series.

The show replaced the second half of the 7.00 pm drama timeslot, airing weekdays from October 2, 2017, 7.30 pm to 8.00 pm on weekdays making it the 5th long form half an hour drama airing together with news-current affairs programme Hello Singapore at 6.30pm.

Cast

Liu (Lianhua) Family

Chen (Feng) Family

(Rashid) Bin Mohammed Family

Zeng (Fuhua) Family

Xu (Tao) Family

Song (Jueming) Family

Holli Hamper Company

Cameo Appearance

Awards & Nominations

Original Sound Track (OST)

References 

Chinese television series